−This is a list of seasons completed by the University of Nebraska Omaha Mavericks men's ice hockey team. 

Omaha has made four appearances in the NCAA Division I men's ice hockey tournament.

Season-by-season results

* Winning percentage is used when conference schedules are unbalanced.

Footnotes

References

 
Lists of college men's ice hockey seasons in the United States
Omaha Mavericks ice hockey seasons